Ethirostoma is a genus of moths in the family Gelechiidae.

Species
 Ethirostoma interpolata Meyrick, 1922
 Ethirostoma semiacma Meyrick, 1914

References

Gelechiinae